James Edward Poulton (1905-date of death unknown), was a Transavval Colony born, Fijian lawn bowls international who competed in the 1950 British Empire Games.

Bowls career
At the 1950 British Empire Games he won the bronze medal in the pairs event with Leslie Brown.

Personal life
His family moved to Suva in Fiji when James was a child and he later married Gladys Palmer in Suva during 1931.

References

Fijian male bowls players
1905 births
Bowls players at the 1950 British Empire Games
Commonwealth Games bronze medallists for Fiji
Commonwealth Games medallists in lawn bowls
Year of death missing
Medallists at the 1950 British Empire Games